Isadore Gomez (died June 21, 1944, in Alameda, California, at the age of 68) was a Portuguese immigrant, chef and restaurateur in the North Beach neighborhood of San Francisco, California. In 1943, he was recognized by LIFE magazine as one of San Francisco's more colorful characters. 

Gomez left his home in Portugal when he was 18 and made his way to San Francisco. According to his obituary, he arrived in the city penniless, and "friends said his unrecorded charities had kept him that way". He landed his first job as a "swamper" in a local gin-joint on the infamous Barbary Coast. He managed to save enough to buy a small bar at 848 Pacific Avenue. During Prohibition, with his Isadore Gomez' Café, he became known as the city's most beloved violator of the Volstead Act. In 1933, he served a 30-day jail term for bootlegging. Ten years later, in February 1943, Gomez received a presidential pardon.

One of Gomez's great fans was the Armenian-American writer William Saroyan. His famous play The Time of Your Life is about Gomez and is set at Izzy's saloon. Saroyan wrote in his journals that Gomez's place was downtown, "not far from the old Montgomery block, across from the firehouse at First and Pacific". He went on to write:

Izzy's saloon was demolished in 1952. There are currently two steakhouses in the San Francisco Bay Area under the same ownership named after Izzy.

References

Notes
 "San Francisco"; photographic essay. (July 12, 1943). LIFE, p. 78.

External links 
 "About Izzy Gomez" on the website of Izzy's Steaks and Chops

Chefs from California
American restaurateurs
Portuguese emigrants to the United States
Businesspeople from San Francisco
Cuisine of the San Francisco Bay Area
History of San Francisco
1870s births
1944 deaths
Chefs from San Francisco